The Troubled Empire: China in the Yuan and Ming Dynasties is a history book about life and events in China in the Yuan and Ming dynasties, between the Mongol invasion of the Confucian empire in the 1270s and the invasion by the Manchu from the Eurasian Steppe, following extreme cold and drought in the 1630s.

The book is written by Timothy Brook, a distinguished Canadian historian who specializes in the study of China (Sinology).

Synopsis

Reception

Interviews

Notes

References

External links

 The Troubled Empire at Harvard University Press

 

2010 non-fiction books
History books about the Ming dynasty
History books about the Yuan dynasty
Political history
Books by Timothy Brook
Harvard University Press books